The Mușenița gas field is a natural gas field located in Mușenița, Suceava County. It was discovered in 2012 and developed by and Zeta Petroleum. It will begin production in 2014 and will produce natural gas and condensates. The total proven reserves of the Mușenița gas field are around 80 billion cubic feet (2.26 km³), and production is slated to be around 37 million cubic feet/day (1×105m³) in 2010.

References

Natural gas fields in Romania